The Brains is the debut album by The Brains.  It was released in 1980 and contains the original recording of "Money Changes Everything", which, when released three years later, became a substantial hit single for pop singer Cyndi Lauper.

Critical reception
At the time of issuance the album made a great impression on Billboard critics. In the review of May 3 1980, they wrote: "This is a truly offbeat album which mixes '60s organ dominated psychedelia, new wave, heavy metal and world savvy lyrics into an intoxicating brew. Tom Gray's passionate vocals have enough aural sprawl and power to make the lyrics credible."

Track listing
All songs written by Tom Gray except where noted.
 "Treason" (Rick Price) 2:33
 "See Me" 4:57
 "Raeline" 1:52
 "Girl I Wanna" 3:42
 "In the Night" (Alfredo Villar) 5:23
 "Money Changes Everything" 3:29
 "Scared Kid" 3:10
 "Sweethearts" (Villar) 3:49
 "Girl in a Magazine" 3:08
 "Gold Dust Kids" 4:16

Personnel

The Brains
Tom Gray: Vocals, Keyboards, Synthesizers
Rick Price: Acoustic and Electric Guitars
Bryan Smithwick: Bass
Charles Wolff: Drums, Percussion, Vocals

Additional Personnel
Debbie Thompson, Sue Wilkinson, Anne Boston, Joann Elsey, Joe Roman, Mark Richardson: Backing Vocals on "Sweethearts"

Production
Arranged by The Brains
Produced and Mastered by Steve Lillywhite
Recorded and Mixed by Steve Lillywhite and Mark Richardson
All songs published by ATV Music/Gray Matter Music.

References

1980 debut albums
The Brains albums
Mercury Records albums
Albums produced by Steve Lillywhite